The Bosai Cup is an invitational Go competition consisting of one player each from China, Japan, and South Korea.

Outline
The tournament consists of three players. One of the three players is given a bye. The remaining two players play a match, with the winner progressing to the final. The loser of the first match plays the player with the bye, with the winner of this match progressing to the final. The winner of the first match then plays the winner of the second match to decide the winner of the title.

Iyama Yuta, representing Japan, was the winner of 1st Bosai Cup - the first edition, defeating Gu Li in the final.

Past winners and runners-up

References

International Go competitions